Timothy James Harvey (born 20 November 1961) is a British racing driver, best known for being the 1992 British Touring Car Champion, and the 2008 and 2010 Porsche Carrera Cup Great Britain champion. A household name in the 1990s, Harvey won sixteen races in the British Touring Car Championship between 1987 and 1995, and competed in the series until 2002. He was also the winner of the invitational Guia Race of Macau touring car event, in 1989.

After leaving touring car racing, Harvey moved into the one-make Porsche Carrera Cup Great Britain series; after two guest drives in 2003, including one victory, Harvey competed full-time from the 2004 season onwards. In seven full seasons in the championship, Harvey finished in the top four of the final championship standings in each season, and left the series after a class victory in the Porsche Carrera World Cup meeting at the Nürburgring, with a series record of 35 overall victories. Along with media commitments for television broadcaster ITV4, and their coverage of the British Touring Car Championship, Harvey currently competes in the British GT Championship; sharing a Porsche with Jon Minshaw, for the Trackspeed team.

BTCC career
Born in Farnborough, London, Harvey first raced in the BTCC in 1987, taking three Class A wins in a Rover Vitesse In 1988 and 1989 he dovetailed sports car racing with BTCC outings, before finishing third in Class A in 1989 and 1990.

He was 8th overall in 1991. His 1992 title was achieved while driving a BMW 318 coupe, run by Vic Lee Motorsport. He won five of the last seven races, having previously only won once. A dramatic final race saw him beat John Cleland and reigning champion Will Hoy to the title, after Hoy suffered an engine failure and Cleland clashed with Harvey's team-mate Steve Soper. He had a difficult 1993 season developing the Renault 19 for the new Renault entry but still managed to win the European Grand Prix support race in lurid conditions, while he was outpaced by team-mate Alain Menu in 1994 in the new Laguna. He raced for Volvo in 1995, using his wealth of experience to develop the all new Volvo 850 saloon, finishing 5th overall and taking 2 wins but generally unable to match team-mate Rickard Rydell. His experience was then used to develop the new Peugeot 406, signing with the French marque in 1996 but was unable to deliver the win that eluded Peugeot during the heyday of the supertouring years. He drove for Peugeot in the 1996, 1997 and 1998 seasons, his best year being 1997 where he finished 9th in the championship, which included two 2nd-place finishes, and strong drives in the wet at Thruxton.

After a couple of years away, his last BTCC years were 2001 (8th overall in a JSM Alfa Romeo) and 10th in 2002 (reuniting with Vic Lee to drive one of his Peugeots, before quitting the series to pursue a media career).
The Alfa Romeo 147 that Tim Harvey raced is now owned by Allitalia – an Independent Italian Auto Specialist based in North Wales.

Porsche Carrera Cup
He has raced in the Porsche Carrera Cup for several years, finishing second to Richard Westbrook in 2004 and Damien Faulkner in 2006. In 2007, Harvey drove for Redline Racing in the new 997 Porsche GT3 in the British edition of the Carrera Cup. With stars such as Faulkner, Westbrook, Danny Watts and Richard Williams no longer competing, and Tim now in the top team of 2006, he started as title favourite, but finished up second again, by just four points behind James Sutton.

In 2008 he continued to battle for the title, making his 100th series start (from just 106 races in total). Tim won the Porsche Carrera Cup Drivers Championship, on 21 September at Brands Hatch. He holds series records for podium finishes and fastest laps. He finished third in 2009, taking his first win of the year in race 6 at Thruxton and a double win at Snetterton. He then opened 2010 with nine wins in the first ten races (by contrast, he took 4 wins en route to the 2008 title). He wrapped up the 2010 title with one race to spare at Brands Hatch on 9 October with a second-place finish behind Stephen Jelley to ensure that he could not be caught by championship runner up Michael Caine. Following a puncture in race 20 which saw Harvey fail to score points for the first time in the season, Harvey claimed the 2010 Porsche Carrera Cup GB Championship by 10 points, with 11 race wins (vs. Caine's 7). Harvey's two wins at Croft on 20 June saw him become the most successful driver in the history of the championship, with 33 race wins at the time (beating Richard Westbrook's 31 wins). He would end the season 4 clear, with 35 wins, and over 150 podiums.

At the end of May 2011, Harvey announced he was quitting the championship with immediate effect, citing difficulty in adapting to regulation changes as his motivation and allowing up and coming Kieran Vernon the opportunity to benefit from his seat in the Motorbase Performance car. He explained during the ITV4 coverage of the Oulton Park BTCC round on 5 June 2011 that he was not entirely retiring from racing and would be reappearing somewhere before long whilst continuing to commentate for ITV.

In what may have been his last Porsche race, Harvey won the Porsche Carrera Cup GB race held at a wet Nürburgring in Germany as part of the Porsche Carrera World Cup. Harvey finished 13th overall, ahead of a number of the faster Supercup models.

Other racing
Harvey has also been a prolific winner in sports cars.  A distinguished career in international motorsport has given him a deep-seated knowledge of the business and substantial reserves of experience.  A factory driver for Spice in the halcyon days of the World Sportscar Championship saw Tim battling the Jaguars and Mercedes Benz during the 1989 and 1990 seasons.  He twice won the BRDC C2 Championship in 1988 and 1989.  He has also contested the 24 Hours of Le Mans four times, winning his class in 1987. He won the British Sports Car Championship in 1999.

He is a double winner of the Oulton Park Gold Cup in 2000 and 2001, joining previous winners Stirling Moss, Jim Clark, Jackie Stewart and many others. Tim has made sporadic albeit successful outings in the British GT Championship, winning alongside various drivers in 2004 and 2005.

Harvey has also been a Touring car winner internationally, coming first in the Macau Grand Prix street race in 1989 and the Wellington International in 1994. He has successfully raced in Japan, Australia, South Africa and all over Europe.

On 19 June 2011, Tim won a Round of the Ginetta GT Supercup at Croft.

Tim also competes occasionally in enduro events on a motorcycle.

Other work
Aside from his racing, Tim combines his commentary and presenting work for ITV and Motors TV with various other motorsport roles, including acting as driver coach for many up and coming young British drivers. He has also coached the Oxford University Motor Drivers Club to success in the British Universities Karting Championship.

In 2008, Tim was appointed Director of the British Racing Drivers' Club (BRDC) SuperStars program, designed to support the most promising young British drivers both financially and in an advisory role.

In 2021 he appeared at a event in his hometown at Motorsport UK's new HQ to talk with Jason Plato, Matt Neal and the former's Fuelling Around co-host Dave Vitty.

Racing record

Complete European Touring Car Championship results

(key) (Races in bold indicate pole position) (Races in italics indicate fastest lap)

Complete British Touring Car Championship results
(key) Races in bold indicate pole position (1 point awarded all races 1996 onwards) Races in italics indicate fastest lap (1 point awarded – 1987–1990, 2001 onwards, 1987–1990 in class) (* signifies that driver lead feature race for at least one lap – 1 point awarded 1998 onwards)

 – Race was stopped due to heavy rain. No points were awarded.

‡ Endurance driver

Complete World Touring Car Championship results
(key) (Races in bold indicate pole position) (Races in italics indicate fastest lap)

Complete Japanese Touring Car Championship results
(key) (Races in bold indicate pole position) (Races in italics indicate fastest lap)

Complete Asia-Pacific Touring Car Championship results
(key) (Races in bold indicate pole position) (Races in italics indicate fastest lap)

Complete Bathurst 1000 results

* Super Touring race

Le Mans 24 hours results

Complete British GT results
(key) (Races in bold indicate pole position in class) (Races in italics indicate fastest lap in class)

† Not eligible for points as invitation driver.

References

External links

1961 births
Living people
British Touring Car Championship drivers
British Touring Car Championship Champions
English racing drivers
24 Hours of Le Mans drivers
British GT Championship drivers
British Formula 3000 Championship drivers
People from Bicester
People from Farnborough, London
Porsche Supercup drivers
World Sportscar Championship drivers
Porsche Carrera Cup GB drivers
Ginetta GT4 Supercup drivers
Peugeot Sport drivers
BMW M drivers